Ariel Coronel may refer to:

 Ariel Coronel (Argentine footballer) (born 1987), Argentine defender
 Ariel Coronel (Paraguayan footballer) (born 1987), Paraguayan defender